Vigdis Sigmundsdóttir (1 March 1934 – 23 February 2023) was an artist from the Faroe Islands, known internationally for producing a collage of 12 motives from Ormurin Langi (The Long Serpent) that resulted in a series of stamps from Postverk Føroya released in 2006.

Biography 
Sigmundsdóttir started to draw as a child, with aquarelle and paint on canvas. As a daughter of the Faroese painter Sigmund Petersen, she had favourable surroundings for developing as an artist. Later she mainly concentrated on colourful paper collages. As collages became her passion, she developed her own style and inspiration from the particular light and weather on the Faroe Islands.

Sigmundsdóttir was a part of an artistic family, and her sister Bibi, niece Aggi Ásgerð Ásgeirsdóttir and niece Vígdis Petersen are artists.

Sigmundsdóttir moved to the island of Suðuroy, which is the most southern part of Faroe Islands. She died on 23 February 2023, at the age of 88.

Education 
1956: Graduated as a Nurse from Randers Centralsygehus
1960s: Attended courses on artistic drawing and painting at the School of Art in Randers
1972: Graduated as an Indoor Architect from Arkitekt Akademiet in Copenhagen
1980: Attended drawing and painting courses at the Nordic House in Tórshavn

Exhibitions 

1995 The Faroese House, Copenhagen
2000 The Faroese House, Copenhagen
2001 Galleri Gertrud, Copenhagen
2002 Smiðjan í Lítluvík, Tórshavn
2004 Ormurin Langi in 'Kulturhuset Førde', Fjalar og Hyllestad, Norway
2004 Ministry of Culture, Tórshavn
2005 Ormurin Langi in the Nordic House, Reykjavík
2006 Ormurin Langi released as 12 stamps
2006 Bella Centeret in Copenhagen in association with a Viking Rotary Convention 
2006 Drew Christmas stamps for Y´Mænds Club, Odense
2007 Helligåndshuset, Randers

Gallery - Ormurin langi (The Long Serpent) 
Below are some of the art works with motives from the old Faroese ballad "Ormurin langi", which Sigmundsdóttir has created. They were used in a series of Faroese Stamps by Postverk Føroya in 2006.

References

External links 
Info about the stamp series 'Ormurin Langi'
Faroese stamps
Visitsuduroy.fo

1934 births
2023 deaths
20th-century Faroese painters
20th-century women artists
21st-century painters
21st-century women artists
People from Tvøroyri
Faroese stamp designers
Women stamp designers
Faroese women painters
Women graphic designers